Sky Top Glacier is in the Beartooth Mountains in the U.S. state of Montana.

References

See also
 List of glaciers in the United States

Glaciers of Park County, Montana
Glaciers of Montana